Lawndale station is a station located along SEPTA's Fox Chase Line. It is located at Robbins and Newtown Avenues and serves the Lawndale neighborhood of Northeast Philadelphia. The station has a small shelter and has no parking lot. In FY 2013, Lawndale station had a weekday average of 213 boardings and 201 alightings.

In 2005, SEPTA segregated CSX's Trenton Subdivision freight tracks and the Fox Chase Line passenger tracks that run parallel from Newtown Junction to just south of Cheltenham. Passengers may now only board from the west side platform.

Station layout

References

External links
Schedule for the SEPTA Fox Chase/Newtown line
SEPTA station page for Lawndale

SEPTA Regional Rail stations
Former Reading Company stations